Chrysactinia is a genus of flowering plants in the family Asteraceae, native to Mexico and to the southwestern United States.

 Species
 Chrysactinia acerosa S.F.Blake - San Luis Potosí, Nuevo León, Zacatecas
 Chrysactinia lehtoae D.J.Keil - Sinaloa
 Chrysactinia luzmariae Rzed. & Calderón - Guanajuato 
 Chrysactinia mexicana A.Gray - Texas, New Mexico, Aguascalientes, Chihuahua, Coahuila, Durango, Guanajuato, Hidalgo, México State, Nuevo León, Oaxaca, Puebla, Querétaro, San Luis Potosí, Zacatecas, Tamaulipas, Veracruz
 Chrysactinia pinnata S.Watson - Coahuila, Nuevo León, Querétaro, San Luis Potosí, Tamaulipas
 Chrysactinia truncata S.Watson - Nuevo León, Coahuila, San Luis Potosí, Tamaulipas, Zacatecas

References

Asteraceae genera
Flora of North America
Tageteae